Francis Thomas Hurley (January 12, 1927 – January 10, 2016) was an American prelate of the Catholic Church who served as archbishop of the Archdiocese of Anchorage in Alaska from 1976 to 2001.  He previously served as bishop of the Diocese of Juneau in Alaska from 1971 to 1976 and as auxiliary bishop there from 1970 to 1971,

Biography

Early life 
Francis Hurley was born in San Francisco, California, one of five children of Mark Hurley and Josephine (née Keohane) Hurley. Francis Hurley was ordained to the priesthood by Archbishop John Mitty on June 16, 1951.

Auxiliary Bishop and Bishop of Juneau 
On February 4, 1970, Hurley was appointed auxiliary bishop and apostolic administrator of the Diocese of Juneau and titular bishop of Daimlaig by Pope Paul VI. Hurley received his episcopal consecration on March 19, 1970, from Bishop Mark Hurley, his brother, with Bishops William McManus and Joseph Bernardin, serving as co-consecrators.

Pope Paul appointed Hurley as the second bishop of Juneau on July 20, 1971; he was installed on September 8, 1971. During his tenure, Hurley expanded Catholic ministry in the smaller and more remote communities of the diocese, getting his pilot's license so he could fly there. Hurley helped implement the reforms of the Second Vatican Council, such as promoting more active roles for the laity.

Archbishop of Anchorage 
Paul VI appointed Hurley as the second archbishop of the Archdiocese of Anchorage on May 4, 1976. He was installed on July 8, 1976.

Pope John Paul II accepted Hurley's resignation as archbishop of Anchorage on March 3, 2001. After his retirement, Hurley stayed active in the church. In 2010, he presided over the funeral of former Alaskan Governor Wally Hickel. Hurley died in Anchorage on January 10, 2016, at age 88, after suffering from heart disease since at least 2010.

See also

 Catholic Church hierarchy
 Catholic Church in the United States
 Historical list of the Catholic bishops of the United States
 List of Catholic bishops of the United States
 Lists of patriarchs, archbishops, and bishops

References

External links
Official site of the Holy See

1927 births
2016 deaths
Roman Catholic bishops of Juneau
Roman Catholic archbishops of Anchorage
20th-century Roman Catholic archbishops in the United States
21st-century Roman Catholic archbishops in the United States
American Roman Catholic clergy of Irish descent
People from San Francisco
Roman Catholic Archdiocese of San Francisco
Catholics from California